Sainte-Thècle is a Canadian municipality located in the province of Quebec in the Mékinac Regional County Municipality, in the Batiscanie watershed, in the administrative region of Mauricie.  This municipality of 216 square kilometres is known for its resorts and many small lakes.  The forest and mountain scenery offers exceptional views for tourists and vacationers. Sainte-Thècle is also a destination for hunting, fishing, snowmobile/all-terrain vehicles and other outdoor sports. The church, rectory and cemetery are located on the main hill of the village and are also heritage sites of interest. The municipality's agricultural and forestry industries have marked its history.

Geography

Sainte-Thècle is located at the junction of provincial roads 153 and 352. Road 153, which runs north–south, connects Yamachiche to Lac-aux-Sables through Saint-Tite. On its way to Sainte-Thècle, route 153 covers the path of the great rang St-Georges, Notre-Dame street, St-Jacques street and road St-Pierre-North. route 352, which runs east–west. from Trois-Rivières, through Saint-Stanislas, Saint-Adelphe, and Sainte-Thècle, on the path of road Rompré and road St-Thomas, before ending at its juncture with road 153 in the village of Sainte-Thècle.

The municipality of Sainte-Thècle shares borders with Saint-Tite to the south, Grandes-Piles to the southwest, Saint-Roch-de-Mékinac also to the south-west, Trois-Rives to the north, Lac-aux-Sables also to the north, and Saint-Adelphe to the southeast. Most of Sainte-Thècle is part of the Batiscan River watershed, with the exception of a two smalls area in its northeastern territories near Trois-Rives) and Missionary Lake.

Thighest Laurentian Mountains of Middle Mauricie are located in the northwestern part of the municipality of Sainte-Thècle. A dozen of the peaks are over 400 meters high. The tallest are those encircled the lakes that dot the region: lakes Eric (Grandes-Piles), lake Vlimeux, lake Button, Lake Thom, Missionary Lake-North, the Lake Jesuit, "lake de l'Aqueduc", as well as the area along the northwest of Saint-Joseph-South row.

Archange Lake is the border between Grandes-Piles and Sainte-Thècle.

Hydrography

The territory of Sainte-Thècle is characterized by five river sub-basins of the Batiscanie and one of the Saint-Maurice River:

Demographics
Population trend:

Private dwellings occupied by usual residents: 1157 (total dwellings: 1413)

Mother language of Sainte-Thècle's citizens:
 French as first language: 98.2%
 English as first language: 0.4%
 English and French as first language: 0.4%
 Other as first language: 1.0%

Main attractions

Municipal chronology

School chronology

Religious chronology

Coat of arms of Sainte-Thècle 
Since the mid-20th century, the town of Sainte-Thècle uses this blazon trifecta that comes from the College of Arms of Canada. Its original interpretation was tinged with the spirit of Christianity. This blazon was published on April 14, 1958, in the regional newspaper "Le Nouvelliste" (published in Trois-Rivières, QC). On January 17, 1973, René Veillette summarized the original interpretation in a column on the history of Sainte-Thècle, in the journal "Le Dynamique" (published in Saint-Tite, QC). This interpretation has been actualized by the historian Gaétan Veillette in 2012.

The golden triangle in the upper part of the shield symbolizes the saints and heroes of the history, whose example inspired morality and customs. Widely used in heraldic domain, the golden color means brightness, righteousness, faith, strength and constancy. At the center of the first trifecta, the heart means kindness and dedication, recalling the life and accomplishment of Thècle, parish patron. Crown affixed over the heart evokes her sanctification.

The second trifecta, colored in blue azure, symbolizes purity. The fir tree represents the timber industry that dominated the local economy with agriculture throughout history. This fir tree is planted on a hill, which indicates the highest point of the village, the site of the church.

In the third trifecta, at the right of the shield, bees embody the workforce and bravery. Recognized as being laborious, bees inspire respect. In harmony with nature, their role is crucial in the eco-system. The red background shows solidarity and perseverance of this population throughout the difficulties of life and collective issues.

The twig of maple branches in the background represent the common tree in Sainte-Thècle. They evoke the maple groves that produced maple syrup. Maple leaf is also the emblem of the country.

The bottom banner features the official motto of Sainte-Thècle: "Scatter goodness along your path". This motto reflects an attitude to be adopted by each citizen in every action of his life. Finally, the red ribbon that binds the two branches of maple leaves is a sign of unity.

Toponymy 
The name of the municipality results from Saint Thècle, martyred virgin of the 1st century, converted to the Christianism and educated by Saint Paul during its first journey missionary. Thècle was born in Isaurie in Turkey. Tite and Thècle having lived at the same time, the name of this virgin was retained for the canonical foundation of this parish of the Mid Mauricie as of March 15, 1873 decree promulgated by Mgr. Louis-François Richer Laflèche, bishop of the diocese of Trois-Rivières. Moreover, Moïse Proulx, priest of Saint-Tite served the parish of Sainte-Thècle until 1880, or until the arrival of the first resident priest.

The toponymy of the rows ("rangs" in French) of the parish embodies the run-up of Christendom of the 19th century: Saint-Joseph, Saint-Michel, Saint-Pierre, Saint-Georges, and Saint Thomas which is the last one to be merged to the municipality of Sainte-Thècle in 1891.

The main arteries of the village are the old Notre-Dame, Saint-Jacques, Masson, Grenier, Lacordaire, Tessier, Station, and Du Pont. The latter street derives its name from the floating bridge on Lake Croche, which connected the lower village to road St-Michel (north). With the expansion of the village, the names of new streets was a common surname: Bédard street, Veillette, Valley, Piché, Proteau Square, Cloutier Square, Marcotte road, Marchand road ... Centennial Street (rue du Centenaire) was erected during Celebration of the Sainte-Thècle Centennial in 1973–74, in parallel to the Villeneuve street. Several roads were designated according to their geographical context: Chemin de l'Anse (Cove Road), Lake Jesuit, Lake Traverse, Lake Aylwin, Lejeune Township, Lake Button... Finally, "Joseph St-Amant" road in Lejeune Township makes tribute to this businessman of Saint-Tite, who has greatly contributed to the forest industry. He owned a sawmill located on "Ruisseau Le Bourdais" street in the town of Saint-Tite.

At the end of the nineteenth century, the village of Sainte-Thècle was divided in two zones: the lower village (the oldest, located between the lake Croche and the lake-aux-Chicots) and the village of the station (which was formed with the economical impact of station of the railroad, arrived in Sainte-Thècle in 1887). Finally the erection of the church, from 1903 to 1905, engendered the construction of streets Saint-Jacques and Masson, creating a third village.

Main personalities linked to the locality

Photo gallery

Publishing about the history of Sainte-Thècle

See also

References

External links

Incorporated places in Mauricie
Municipalities in Quebec
Mékinac Regional County Municipality